Kenneth Hartley Blanchard (born May 6, 1939) is an American author, business consultant and motivational speaker. His writing career includes 60+ published books, most of which are co-authored books. His most successful book, The One Minute Manager, has sold over 15 million copies and been translated into many languages.

Blanchard is also the Chief Spiritual Officer of The Ken Blanchard Companies, an international management training and consulting firm that he and his wife, Marjorie Blanchard, co-founded in 1979 in San Diego, California.   Blanchard is known for the quote "None of us is as smart as all of us."

Education
Blanchard attended New Rochelle High School, and graduated in 1957. He completed a BA degree in government and philosophy at Cornell University in 1961, an MA degree in sociology and counseling at Colgate University in 1963 and a PhD degree in education administration and leadership at Cornell University in 1967.

Blanchard is a Cornell University trustee emeritus and visiting professor at the Cornell University School of Hotel Administration. He and his wife were named Cornell Entrepreneurs of the Year in 1991.

Notable Works

Ken's writing career includes more than 60 books, and hundreds of keynote speeches. Some of his most notable books include:
 The One Minute Manager (co-authored with Spencer Johnson), combines Blanchard's management theory with the parable writing style Johnson established in his Value Tales for children in the 1970s. In 2001, a Wall Street Journal article noted that The One Minute Manager bore a resemblance to an article written by Blanchard's former colleague, Arthur Elliott Carlisle. Carlisle's allegations of plagiarism were never proven.
 Raving Fans: A Revolutionary Approach to Customer Service (1993)
 Leadership and the One Minute Manager: Increasing Effectiveness Through Situational Leadership® (1985) (in which he coined the term seagull manager)
 Gung Ho! Turn On the People in Any Organization (1997)
 Whale Done! The Power of Positive Relationships (2002)
 Leading at a Higher Level: Blanchard on Leadership and Creating High Performing Organizations (2006).

See also
Situational leadership theory
Spencer Johnson
Business fable

References

Bibliography

 Servant Leadership in Action: How You Can Achieve Great Relationships and Results (edited by Ken Blanchard and Renee Broadwell) (2018), Berrett-Koehler Publishers; .
 One Minute Mentoring: How to Find and Work With a Mentor--and Why You'll Benefit from Being One (with Claire Diaz-Ortiz, 2017), William Morrow; .
 Collaboration Begins with You: Be a Silo Buster (with Jane Ripley and Eunice Parisi-Carew, 2015), Berrett-Koehler Publishers; .
 Refire! Don't Retire: Make the Rest of Your Life the Best of Your Life (with Morton Shaevitz, 2015), Berrett-Koehler Publishers; .
 The Secret: What Great Leaders Know and Do, 3rd Edition (with Mark Miller, 2014), Berrett-Koehler Publishers; .
 Fit at Last: Look and Feel Better Once and for All (with Tim Kearin, 2014), Berrett-Koehler Publishers; .
 Great Leaders Grow: Becoming a Leader for Life (with Mark Miller, 2012), Berrett-Koehler Publishers; .
 Lead With LUV (with Colleen Barrett, 2011); .
 Full Steam Ahead!: Unleash the Power of Vision in Your Work and Your Life, 2nd Edition (with Jesse Lyn Stoner, 2011), Berrett-Koehler Publishers, .
 Whale Done Parenting: How to Make Parenting a Positive Experience for You and Your Kids (with Thad Lacinak, Chuck Tompkins, and Jim Ballard, 2009), Berrett-Koehler Publishers; .
 Who Killed Change?: Solving the Mystery of Leading People Through Change (with John Britt, Pat Zigarmi, and Judd Hoekstra, 2009) 
 Helping People Win at Work: A Business Philosophy Called Don't Mark My Paper, Help Me Get an A (with Garry Ridge, 2009) 
 The One Minute Entrepreneur (with Don Hutson and Ethan Willis, 2008) 
 4th Secret of the One Minute Manager: A Powerful Way to Make Things Better (with Margret McBride, 2008) * The Mulligan: A Parable of Second Chances (with Wally Armstrong) (Thomas Nelson, 2007) 
 Go Team!: Take Your Team to the Next Level (with Alan Randolph, and Peter Grazier, 2007), Berrett-Koehler Publishers; .
 Know Can Do!: Put Your Know-How Into Action (with Paul J Meyer and Dick Ruhe, 2007), Berrett-Koehler Publishers; 
 Leading at a Higher Level: Blanchard on Leadership and Creating High Performing Organizations (FT Press, 2006) 
 Lead Like Jesus: Lessons from the Greatest Leadership Role Model of All Time (with Phil Hodges) (Thomas Nelson, 2006) .
 The Simple Truths of Service (with Barbara Glanz) (Blanchard Family Partnership, 2005) 
 Self Leadership and the One Minute Manager: Increasing Effectiveness Through Situational Self Leadership (with Susan Fowler and Laurence Hawkins) (William Morrow, 2005) 
 One Solitary Life (HarperCollins Business, 2005) 
 The On-time, On-Target Manager (One Minute Manager) (with Steve Gottry) (HarperCollins Entertainment, 2004) , 
 Heart of a Leader: Insights on the Art of Influence (HarperCollins Business, 2004) 
 Customer Mania! It's Never Too Late to Build a Customer-Focused Company (Free Press, 2004) 
 The Leadership Pill: The Missing Ingredient in Motivating People Today (HarperCollins Business, 2003) ISBN 
 Servant Leader (HarperCollins Business, 2003) ISBN 
 Managing By Values: How to Put Your Values into Action for Extraordinary Results (with Michael O'Connor, 2003) Berrett-Koehler Publishers; .
 Whale Done! : The Power of Positive Relationships (with Thad Lacinak, Chuck Tompkins, and Jim Ballard, HarperCollins Business, 2002) ISBN 
 The One Minute Apology: A Powerful Way to Make Things Better (with Margaret McBride, HarperCollins Business, 2002) ISBN 
 The Generosity Factor (TM), The (HarperCollins Business, August 1 2002) ISBN 
 High Five! The Magic of Working Together (with Sheldon Bowles, HarperCollins Business, January 1 2001) ISBN 
 Empowerment Takes More Than a Minute (with John P. Carlos and Alan Randolph, 2001), Berrett-Koehler Publishers, .
 The 3 Keys to Empowerment: Release the Power Within People for Astonishing Results (with John P. Carlos, and Alan Randolph, 2001), Berrett-Koehler Publishers, .
 Big Bucks! (with Sheldon Bowles, William Morrow, 2000) 
 The One Minute Manager Balances Work and Life (One Minute Manager Library) (HarperCollins Business, 1999) ISBN 
 The One Minute Golfer: Enjoying the Great Game More (One Minute Manager Library) (HarperCollins Business, 1999) ISBN 
 The 3 Keys to Empowerment: Release the Power Within People for Astonishing Results (HarperCollins Business, 1999) ISBN 
 Leadership by the Book: Tools to Transform Your Workplace (with Bill Hybels and Phil Hodges, HarperCollins Business, 1999) ISBN 
 Gung Ho! Turn On the People in Any Organization (with Sheldon Bowles, HarperCollins Business, 1998) ISBN 
 Mission Possible: Becoming A World-Class Organization While There's Still Time (HarperCollins Business, 1996) ISBN 
 Empowerement Takes More than a Minute (with John P Carlos and Alan Randolph, 1996) ISBN
 Raving Fans a Revolutionary Approach to Customer Service (with Sheldon Bowles, HarperCollins Business, 1993) ISBN 
 Playing the Great Game of Golf: Making Every Minute Count (1992)
 The One Minute Manager Builds High Performing Teams (with Don Carew and Eunice Parisi-Carew, William Morrow & Co, 1990, 3rd ed, 2009)
 One Minute Manager Meets The Monkey, The (HarperCollins Business, 1989) ISBN 
 Management of Organizational Behavior: Utilizing Human Resources (with Paul Hersey, 5th ed, 1988)
 The Power of Ethical Management (with Norman Vincent Peale, HarperCollins Business, 1988) ISBN 
 The One Minute Manager Gets Fit (with D.W. Edington and Marjorie Blanchard, 1986) ISBN
 Leadership and the One Minute Manager: Increasing Effectiveness Through Situational Leadership (with Patricia Zigarmi and Drea Zigarmi, HarperCollins Business, 1985) 
ISBN
 Organizational Change Through Effective Leadership (with Robert H. Guest and Paul Hersey, 2nd ed 1985) ISBN
 Putting the One Minute Manager to Work (with Robert Lobrber, William Morrow & Co, 1984) ISBN 
 The One Minute Manager: The Quickest Way to Increase Your Own Prosperity (with Spencer Johnson, William Morrow & Co, 1982) 
 ''The Family Game: A Situational Approach to Effective Parenting (with Paul Hersey, 1979) ISBN 

1939 births
Living people
American business writers
Cornell University alumni
People from Orange, New Jersey
Writers from New Jersey
Writers from New Rochelle, New York
New Rochelle High School alumni